Mugali may be:
Lambichhong language (Kiranti, Ethnologue 17)
Mugom dialect (Tibetan, Ethnologue 12)